California Proposition 64 may refer to:
 1986 California Proposition 64
 2004 California Proposition 64
 2016 California Proposition 64